St. John's Episcopal Church is a historic Episcopal church located on the southeast corner of SR 1917 and SR 1753 in St. John's, Pitt County, North Carolina. It was built between 1893 and 1895, and is a one-story, gable front frame building.  It has a projecting vestibule, is sheathed in weatherboard, rests on a brick pier foundation, and has a steeply pitched gable roof.  The interior features a barrel vault ceiling.

It was added to the National Register of Historic Places in 1986.

References

Episcopal church buildings in North Carolina
Churches on the National Register of Historic Places in North Carolina
Churches completed in 1895
19th-century Episcopal church buildings
Churches in Pitt County, North Carolina
National Register of Historic Places in Pitt County, North Carolina